Vincent Rattez (born 24 March 1992) is a French rugby union player who plays the regular position of wing and he currently plays for Montpellier and the France national team.

International career
Rattez was part of the French squad for the 2017 France rugby union tour of South Africa. He made his debut in the first test.

International tries

References

External links
France profile at FFR
L'Équipe profile
ESPN Profile

1992 births
Living people
French rugby union players
France international rugby union players
Rugby union wings
RC Narbonne players
Stade Rochelais players
Montpellier Hérault Rugby players